Hegigio Gorge Pipeline Bridge is, with a height of 393 metres, the world's sixth highest bridge and highest pipeline bridge. Hegigio Gorge Pipeline Bridge is a suspension bridge spanning 470 metres over the Hegigio River. It is used for transporting petroleum oil from Southeast Mananda oil field in the Southern Highlands Province of Papua New Guinea.

Hegigio Gorge Pipeline Bridge became the world's highest bridge when it was completed in 2005 and remained the highest until the opening of the Sidu River Bridge in China in 2009.

See also
List of highest bridges in the world

External links

Transport buildings and structures in Papua New Guinea
Bridges in Papua New Guinea
Bridges completed in 2005
Suspension bridges
Steel bridges